Lauri Asko Antero Sarkola (born September 3, 1945, in Helsinki) is a Finnish actor and theater manager. He studied at the Svenska Teaterskolan from 1963 to 1966. He had a long career at the Swedish-speaking Lilla Teatern, where he first starred in 1967–1974 and served as deputy director from 1972 to 1974. In 1974–1981 and 1984–1997, Sarkola was the director of Lilla Teatern. From 1982 to 1985, Sarkola worked as a professor at the Helsinki Theatre Academy. He directed the Helsinki City Theatre from 1998 to 2016.

Sarkola has played numerous roles in television, theater and movies. He starred in the lead, author Algot Untola, in the 1980 film Flame Top. Sarkola has acted in both Finnish and Swedish films and acted as a narrator in the Finnish version of radio drama The Men from the Ministry.

Sarkola has been the chairman of the Finlands Svenska Teaterförbundet 1978–1983, 1985–1986, the chairman of the Centralförbundet för Finlands svenska theater organizer 1983–1988, the Finnish representative of the Nordic Theater and Dance Committee 1988–2000 and the only member of the Norwegian Ministry of Culture's theater committee. In 2013, Sarkola selected the recipient of the Finlandia Prize for Literature. Sarkola retired from the position of director of the Helsinki City Theater at the end of 2016. In the autumn of 2017, he played the role of Marshal Mannerheim in Juha Vakkuri's play Mannerheim ja saksalainen suudelma ("Mannerheim and the German Kiss").

Sarkola has been married twice, of whom he has three children from his first marriage (1978–1984). Since 1990, Sarkola has been married to actress Jonna Järnefelt and they have three children in common.

Selected filmography
Flame Top (Tulipää, 1980)
Beyond the Front Line (Framom främsta linjen, 2004)
1944: The Final Defence (Tali-Ihantala 1944, 2007)
Blackout (2008)
Bad Family (Paha perhe, 2010)
The Human Part (Ihmisen osa, 2018)

Further reading

References

External links

1945 births
Living people
Male actors from Helsinki
20th-century Finnish male actors
21st-century Finnish male actors
Finnish male film actors
Finnish male stage actors
Finnish male television actors
Academic staff of the University of the Arts Helsinki
Pro Finlandia Medals of the Order of the Lion of Finland